LaSalle station is a Montreal Metro station in the borough of Verdun, in Montreal, Quebec, Canada. It is operated by the Société de transport de Montréal (STM) and serves the Green Line. The station opened on September 3, 1978, as part of the extension of the Green Line westward to Angrignon station.

Architecture and art 
Designed by Didier, Gillon et Larouche, it is a normal side platform station with one ticket hall and access. The platform and mezzanine walls are enlivened by large, irregular concrete planes painted in bright colours, designed by Michèle Tremblay-Gillon, while a stainless-steel mural by Peter Gnass above the ticket hall reflects sunlight and passengers' movements.

Origin of the name
This station is named for nearby LaSalle Boulevard, named for explorer Robert Cavelier de La Salle (1643–1687), who founded the town of Lachine and claimed Louisiana for France.

Since the station is not located in the neighbouring borough of LaSalle, alternative names have been proposed, including Paul-Grégoire and Curé-Caisse; the latter name was approved by the Montreal Urban Community in 1984, but for unknown reasons the name change was not carried out.

Connecting bus routes

Nearby points of interest
 Champlain Bridge
 Maison Saint-Gabriel
 Île des Soeurs

References

External links

 Lasalle Station - official site
 Montreal by Metro, metrodemontreal.com - photos, information, and trivia
 2011 STM System Map

Green Line (Montreal Metro)
Railway stations in Canada opened in 1978
Verdun, Quebec